KQKZ (92.1 FM "Q92.1") is a commercial radio station that is licensed to serve the community of Bakersfield, California. It is owned by Lotus Communications. Its studios are located in southwest Bakersfield, while its transmitter is located northeast of the city. It is a classic hits station branded Q92.1 (pronounced Q ninety-two-one).

History

Early years
The station received its construction permit in 1985, and signed on as KIWI in 1987. In 1999, Lotus Communications acquired the station. The sale was consummated on August 24 of that year. For much of its existence before 2003, it played classical music.

On January 21, 2003, the station changed its call sign to KPSL-FM. Over the years, the station would become a latin music station with the Concierto branding.

On September 8, 2011, KPSL-FM swapped callsigns and formats with KVMX. With the format swap, it became a classic hits station branded as "The New 92-1 Max-FM".

On May 6, 2013, KVMX flipped to country, branded as "KiX 92.1". During this time, KVMX would carry syndicated programming from Premiere Networks, including a country countdown show. This format would last for slightly over 3 years.

Simulcast of KCHJ
On July 1, 2016, KVMX broke away from country programming and began simulcasting KCHJ 1010 AM, with its "El Gallito" branding and Ranchera format. Lotus also changed the callsign to KCHJ-FM.

Rhythmic CHR era
On July 5, 2019, It was reported that the station will return to being an English language radio station. In the report, a launch date of July 15 was stated, with the planned on air branding Q92.1. On July 11, Lotus confirmed the rumors, and formally announced the format change to Rhythmic CHR, with the launch date later being pushed back to July 22, in order to allow more time to construct its social media and web pages. As part of the upcoming format change, the station's callsign became KQKZ on July 15. KQKZ officially flipped to the new format at 6:00 a.m. on July 22, with its present "Q92.1" branding, patterned after KSEQ. KQKZ also used KSEQ's on-air personalities in key dayparts, but is still expected to air Bakersfield advertisements, news, traffic and weather.

Return to classic hits
On August 5, 2020, KQKZ suffered an external glitch, that resulted in the station playing classic hits music for nearly two hours. Normal programming was restored at 1:00 p.m. that day. Media watchdogs had suggested possible plans for the station to drop the format after 13 months during the affected period; KQKZ had a mere 0.1 share in the June 2020 Nielsen Audio ratings. Shortly after normal programming resumed, the web link on KQKZ's social pages was changed to KSEQ's website.

Nearly a month later on September 2, the airstaff (voicetracking from KSEQ) bade farewell to its listeners via Instagram in advance of planned changes. At midnight on September 3, after playing "Blinding Lights" by The Weeknd, KQKZ flipped back to classic hits, keeping the "Q92.1" branding (with the glitch turned out to be the forthcoming change). The first song under the classic hits format was "Dance with Me" by Orleans. The format change marked a return of the format to the San Joaquin valley area, as KQKZ previously broadcast the format as KVMX from 2011 to 2013.

On September 8, 2020, KQKZ welcomed Danny Spank (coming from KRAB) as its new morning host, with additional dayparts to be filled in the coming months.

Competition
As of September 2020, KQKZ is an indirect competitor to rock KDFO, and rhythmic oldies KKBB

Former programming
From 2016 to 2019, this station simulcast KCHJ and aired its programming.

Until July 1, 2016, the weekday programming on this station featured the syndicated Bobby Bones Show on mornings, Anne Kelly on mid days.  Rachel Legan was on afternoons. Weekends also featured "The Bobby Bones Country Top 30 Countdown on Sunday Morning."  Kix Brooks "American Country Countdown" was on Sunday evenings

Notable former airstaff on Max FM and Kix include:

Melanie Ruthridge was on mornings (Max) and mid-afternoons and afternoons (Kix) until September 11, 2015.
Kris Winston was program director and was on mornings (Max) and afternoons (Kix) until August 2015.
Doug Deroo was on afternoons (Max) until April 15, 2011.
Gregg Stepp was Program Director and hosted the morning show (Max) from November 1, 2008 until January 12, 2010.

References

External links
Q92.1 Official Webpage
Q92.1 on Instagram
Q92.1 on Facebook 

Radio stations established in 1987
QKZ
1987 establishments in California
Lotus Communications stations
Classic hits radio stations in the United States